Zacari David Hughes (born 6 June 1971) is an Australian former professional footballer who played in the Football League, as a defender.

References

Sources
Zacari Hughes, Neil Brown

1971 births
Living people
Australian soccer players
Association football defenders
Rochdale A.F.C. players
English Football League players